A swathe (rhymes with "bathe") or swath (rhymes with "cloth") is the width of a scythe stroke or a mowing-machine blade, the path of this width made in mowing or the mown grass or grain lying on such a path.
The mower with a scythe moves along the mowing-edge with the uncut grass to the right and the cut grass laid in a neat row to the left, on the previously mown land.  The swathe width depends on the blade length, the nature of the crop and the mower but is usually about 1.5 metres wide.  Mowing may be done by a team of mowers, usually starting at the edges of a meadow then proceeding clockwise leaving a series of staggered swathes and finishing in the middle.

The mower swings the scythe steadily in long, left handed arcs ending in front of the mower and depositing the cut grass neatly to the left.  The mower takes a small step forward and repeats the motion, proceeding with a steady rhythm, stopping at frequent intervals to hone the blade.  The correct technique has a slicing action on the grass, cutting a narrow strip, leaving a uniform stubble on the ground and forming a regular windrow on the left.

The scythe has generally been replaced by machinery such as the swather pictured, or combine harvester which still leaves a swathe to its left but is very much wider than the scythe.  Early in the introduction of machinery, it was still necessary for mowers with scythes to open up a swathe wide enough to take the machine before it could start.

Swath width 

By analogy, Swath width also refers to the width of any repetitively cut or treated strip.  For example, the strip of the Earth’s surface from which geographic data are collected by a moving vehicle such as a satellite, aircraft or ship in the course of swath mapping. The longitudinal extent of the swath is defined by the motion of the vehicle with respect to the surface, whereas the swath width is measured perpendicularly to the longitudinal extent of the swath. Swath width is also cited in the context of sonar specifications. It is measured and represented in metres or kilometres.

References

Agricultural terminology
Geologic maps
Remote sensing